Khait may refer to:

Chait, an alternative transliteration
Hait (disambiguation), an alternative transliteration